Dr Ernst Weiss (German: Weiß, August 28, 1882 – June 15, 1940) was a German-speaking Austrian physician and author of Jewish descent. He is the author of Ich, der Augenzeuge (The Eyewitness), a novel dealing with the Hitler period.

Biography
Ernst Weiss was born in Brünn, Moravia, Austro-Hungarian Empire (now Brno in the Czech Republic) to the family of a prosperous Jewish cloth merchant. After his father died when he was four, he was brought up by his mother Berta, née Weinberg, who led him to art. However, after completing his secondary education in Brno, Litoměřice and Hostinné, he came to Prague to study medicine. In 1908 he finished his studies in Vienna and became a surgeon. He practiced in Bern, Vienna, and Berlin but he developed tuberculosis and tried to recover as a ship doctor on a trip to India and Japan in 1912. In 1913 he met Rahel Sanzara, a dancer, actress and, later, novelist, and their relationship lasted until she died of cancer in 1936. In the same year he met Franz Kafka and they became close friends. Kafka wrote in his Diaries 1914: "January 2. A lot of time well spent with Dr. Weiss". Weiss was in touch with other writers of the Prague Circle such as Franz Werfel, Max Brod, and Johannes Urzidil. In 1914 Weiss returned to Austria to start a military physician career. He served for the duration of World War I on the Eastern Front, ultimately earning a golden cross for bravery. After the war he lived in Prague, then the capital of Czechoslovakia. He gave up medical career in 1920 when he finished working in a Prague hospital. In 1921 he moved to Berlin, and began his most prolific period of writing, publishing nearly a novel a year. This period came to an end when, in 1933, he returned to Prague to care for his dying mother. He could not enter Nazi Germany and so he left for Paris in 1934. There he lived a poor life dependent on help from authors such as Thomas Mann and Stefan Zweig. He applied for, but did not receive, a grant from the American guild for German cultural freedom.

Weiss's last novel, The Eyewitness, written in 1938, describes a young German veteran of World War I, identified as "A.H.," who has been sent to a military hospital because he is suffering from hysterical blindness (now termed conversion disorder). The character is evidently modeled on Adolf Hitler, who was indeed treated for conversion disorder at a military hospital in Pasewalk, but scholars dispute to what extent the account is fictional. The writer Walter Mehring claimed in his autobiography that Weiss had access in Paris to Hitler's Pasewalk medical file, which had been sent out of the country for safekeeping by Edmund Forster, the psychiatrist who treated Hitler. The whereabouts of the file today are unknown, however, and the real Edmund Forster disapproved of hypnosis, the treatment used to cure "A.H." in Weiss's novel.

Weiss committed suicide on 14 June 1940 when German troops invaded the city. His attempt to deal with poison in his hotel room did not succeed immediately, but he died as a result only in the following night in a Paris hospital.

Based on thorough research on Hitler and his story at Pasewalk clinique psychologist David Lewis in his book The Man Who Invented Hitler tells also the story of Ernst Weiss and his book on Hitler using pseudonym A.H.

Work 

His work is influenced by Sigmund Freud, his friend Franz Kafka, and authors of then-modern literary Expressionism. He often hints at medical cases and ethics in his novels and stories.

Die Galeere (1913); rejected by twenty-three publishers; Franz Kafka helped to edit it 
Der Kampf (1916)  republished and mainly known today by the name 'Franziska'
Tiere in Ketten (1918)
Mensch gegen Mensch (1919)
Stern der Dämonen (1920)
Nahar (1922)
Männer in der Nacht (1925)
Boetius von Orlamünde (1928, retitled Der Aristokrat in 1966); awarded a silver medal in the literary competition at the 1928 Amsterdam Olympics and the Adalbert Stifter prize 
Georg Letham. Arzt und Mörder (1931)
Der Geisterseher (1934)
Der Gefängnisarzt (1934, reprinted 1969)
Der arme Verschwender (1936, reprinted 1965)
Der Verführer (1937). 
Der Augenzeuge (published posthumously in 1963); published as Ich, der Augenzeuge because of copyright proceedings about Alain Robbe-Grillet's Le Voyeur which was published under the same title

References

External links
 
 
 Profile in AEIOU Oesterreich Lexikon  
 Short biography 

1882 births
1940 suicides
Writers from Brno
People from the Margraviate of Moravia
Jewish Austrian writers
Austrian male writers
Austrian medical writers
Austrian surgeons
Jewish physicians
Olympic silver medalists in art competitions
Medalists at the 1928 Summer Olympics
Suicides in France
Suicides by poison
People from Brno in health professions
Olympic competitors in art competitions
Suicides by Jews during the Holocaust
Moravian Jews
Austrian Jews who died in the Holocaust